Danforth is a town in Washington County, Maine, United States. The town was named for proprietor Thomas Danforth. The population was 587 at the 2020 census. The town contains the villages of Danforth and Eaton. East Grand High School is located in Danforth.

Geography

Climate
This climatic region is typified by large seasonal temperature differences, with warm to hot (and often humid) summers and cold (sometimes severely cold) winters.  According to the Köppen Climate Classification system, Danforth has a humid continental climate, abbreviated "Dfb" on climate maps.

Demographics

2010 census
At the 2010 census there were 589 people, 249 households, and 164 families living in the town. The racial makeup of the town was 95.6% White, 0.2% African American, 1.2% Native American, 1.0% from other races, and 2.0% from two or more races. Hispanic or Latino of any race were 0.2%.

Of the 249 households 26.5% had children under the age of 18 living with them, 47.0% were married couples living together, 10.8% had a female householder with no husband present, 8.0% had a male householder with no wife present, and 34.1% were non-families. 29.7% of households were one person and 10.8% were one person aged 65 or older. The average household size was 2.33 and the average family size was 2.76.

The median age in the town was 46.3 years. 20.9% of residents were under the age of 18; 6.9% were between the ages of 18 and 24; 21% were from 25 to 44; 30.6% were from 45 to 64; and 20.7% were 65 or older. The gender makeup of the town was 50.4% male and 49.6% female.

2000 census
At the 2000 census there were 629 people, 263 households, and 175 families living in the town. The racial makeup of the town was 99.68% White, 0.16% Native American and 0.16% Asian.
Of the 263 households 28.1% had children under the age of 18 living with them, 49.4% were married couples living together, 12.2% had a female householder with no husband present, and 33.1% were non-families. 30.4% of households were one person and 16.7% were one person aged 65 or older.  The average household size was 2.34 and the average family size was 2.84.

The age distribution was 23.7% under the age of 18, 4.8% from 18 to 24, 22.6% from 25 to 44, 27.7% from 45 to 64, and 21.3% 65 or older.  The median age was 44 years. For every 100 females, there were 101.6 males.  For every 100 females age 18 and over, there were 94.3 males.

The median household income was $20,769 and the median family income  was $25,341. Males had a median income of $32,083 versus $17,083 for females. The per capita income for the town was $11,079.  About 21.6% of families and 23.4% of the population were below the poverty line, including 27.2% of those under age 18 and 18.4% of those age 65 or over.

References

Towns in Washington County, Maine
Towns in Maine